Jatoi is a tehsil (an administrative subdivision) of Muzaffargarh District in the Punjab. Its capital is Jatoi. It is located in the southern part of the Punjab province. The estimated population is 714,576. Tehsil Jatoi is known for the Jamia Sakeena-Tu-Sughra, which is constructed in Turkish style.
Shalwar kameez is the common dress, worn by people in Jatoi Tehsil. Being a rural area, most people are connected with agriculture.
Jatoi is famous for its quality cotton crop.

See also
Sardar Kaure Khan Jatoi

References

Muzaffargarh District
Tehsils of Punjab, Pakistan